Samuel Stoner Homestead, also known as Indian Road Farm, Bechtel Farm, and Wiest Dam, is a historic home and farm located at West Manchester Township, York County, Pennsylvania. It was built in three stages: a -story, Germanic influenced limestone banked house built between 1798 and 1801; a second story was added about 1835; and a 2-story, 3-bay stone addition, built about 1850. It measures 62 feet by 30 feet.  Also on the property is a small stone and frame springhouse, a small stone smoke house, and a small frame and stone bank barn, all dating to the mid-19th century.

It was added to the National Register of Historic Places in 1976.

References

Houses on the National Register of Historic Places in Pennsylvania
Houses completed in 1850
Houses in York County, Pennsylvania
National Register of Historic Places in York County, Pennsylvania